Southfield is a village located at the junction of Norfolk and East Hill Roads within the town of New Marlborough in Berkshire County. It is also a post office location for the surrounding area with ZIP Code 01259.

Geography 
Southfield is located at  (42.1014802, -73.2328889).

History 
Southfield was named in 1775 for its location in the southwestern portion of the state.

References

Populated places in Berkshire County, Massachusetts
New Marlborough, Massachusetts